Gunabati Railway Station is located in the heart of Gunabati Bazar. The station is the main station of Gunabati Union and is linked to Dhaka by the Gunabati – Cumilla rail line, to Chattagram by the Gunabati – Feni line.

References

Railway stations in Chittagong Division